Anna Fitídou (also Anna Foitidou, ; born 22 April 1977) is a Cypriot pole vaulter. She set both a national record and a personal best height of 4.30 metres at the second meeting of the IAAF Grand Prix in Thessaloniki, Greece.

Fitidou made her official debut for the 2004 Summer Olympics in Athens, where she placed twenty-fourth in the qualifying rounds of the women's pole vault, clearing her height at 4.15 metres.

At the 2006 Commonwealth Games in Melbourne, Australia, Fitidou achieved her best career result, when she finished tenth in the final round of the women's pole vault, with a satisfying height of 4.15 metres.

At the 2008 Summer Olympics in Beijing, Fitidou successfully cleared a height of 4.00 metres on her third attempt in the women's pole vault. Unfortunately, Fitidou fell short in her bid for the twelve-woman final, as she placed thirty-fourth overall in the qualifying rounds.

Competition record

References

External links

NBC Olympics Profile

Cypriot female pole vaulters
Living people
Olympic athletes of Cyprus
Athletes (track and field) at the 2004 Summer Olympics
Athletes (track and field) at the 2008 Summer Olympics
Athletes (track and field) at the 1998 Commonwealth Games
Athletes (track and field) at the 2002 Commonwealth Games
Athletes (track and field) at the 2006 Commonwealth Games
Commonwealth Games competitors for Cyprus
Sportspeople from Limassol
1977 births
Mediterranean Games silver medalists for Cyprus
Mediterranean Games medalists in athletics
Athletes (track and field) at the 2001 Mediterranean Games
Athletes (track and field) at the 2005 Mediterranean Games